This Moment Is Mine is the third album by American singer Chanté Moore. The album was released on May 25, 1999, through Silas Records and MCA Records. It was Moore's first album release in four and a half years after her previous album, A Love Supreme. The album featured production from Rodney Jerkins, Simon Law, Moore, Robin Thicke, Jermaine Dupri, Jimmy Jam and Terry Lewis, among others.

The album was preceded by the release of two singles — "Chanté's Got a Man" and "I See You in a Different Light". The album peaked at number thirty-one on the Billboard 200 and number seven on the Top R&B/Hip-Hop Albums chart on June 12, 1999.

Background and release
"If I Gave Love" was intended to be released as the second single from her album This Moment Is Mine after "Chanté's Got a Man", but was ultimately scrapped.  Rodney Jerkins had rewritten a "nearly identical song" for singer Jennifer Lopez entitled  "If You Had My Love."  Jerkins rewrote "If I Gave Love" with the same arrangement for Lopez and just changed the title to "If You Had My Love" after it was requested by Sean Combs, Lopez's boyfriend and one of On the 6s producers. Moore said: 
"He wrote the same song for her. I heard that it was because Puff Daddy walked in and heard my song and said 'I want that song,' and he [Rodney] was like 'Well that's already taken. We wrote that for Chante,' and he was like 'I want that song.' So Rodney wrote, really, the same song.".

Critical reception

The album was met with a positive response from music critic Stephen Thomas Erlewine from Allmusic stated "This Moment Is Mine finds Chante Moore at the top of her game, crafting an alluring contemporary soul album that manages to avoid most of the cliches of the genre." Cheo Tyehimba of EW expressed 'though not collectively transcendent, there’s an intimacy akin to a butterscotch candy shared between lovers'

Singles
"Chanté's Got a Man" was released as the album's lead single on May 4, 1999. The song became Moore's first top 10 hit charting at number ten on the Billboard Hot 100 and number two on the Hot R&B/Hip-Hop Songs chart.

"I See You in a Different Light" featuring JoJo Hailey was released as the second single from the album on September 14, 1999. The song charted at number sixty-one on the Hot R&B/Hip-Hop Songs chart on October 9, 1999.

Track listing

Notes
"Chanté's Got A Man" contains elements of "One Bad Apple" written by George Jackson.
"Love And The Woman" contains elements of "Love's Lines, Angles And Rhymes" written by Dorothea Joyce.

Charts

Weekly charts

Year-end charts

Release history

References

1999 albums
Chanté Moore albums
Albums produced by Robin Thicke
Albums produced by Simon Law